R. T. Gaston was a college football player. He was a prominent tackle for the Clemson Tigers of Clemson College, standing 5 feet 8 inches tall and weighing 198 pounds. Gaston was selected All-Southern in 1907, and played opposite another All-Southern tackle in Mac McLaurin.

References

American football tackles
American football guards
Clemson Tigers football players
All-Southern college football players
Players of American football from South Carolina